Katherena Vermette (born 29 January 1977) is a Canadian writer, who won the Governor General's Award for English-language poetry in 2013 for her collection North End Love Songs. Vermette is of Métis descent and originates from Winnipeg, Manitoba. She was an MFA student in creative writing at the University of British Columbia.

In addition to writing, vermette advocates for the equality of Indigenous peoples in Canada, vocalizing her dissatisfaction with the Canadian government and media’s apathy and neglect to Indigenous rights.

Early life 
Born to a Métis father and Mennonite mother, vermette grew up in the North End of Winnipeg, Manitoba, a neighbourhood distinguished by a relatively high population of Indigenous people (approximately 25%), primarily First Nations and Métis people. Winnipeg, a city often singled out for its high rate of reported crimes, garners further negative outsider attention in its North End because of its dense number of reported crimes. In an interview with CBC Radio, vermette described her childhood as not being "picturesque", in the usual sense of the word. For vermette, growing up in the North End of Winnipeg meant that things were not always simple and, from a young age, she bore witness to the kind of injustice and prejudice that young people are typically spared from. An example of this injustice came when a 14-year-old vermette lost her older brother, the just 18 year-old Donovan, who was missing for six months prior to being found dead. Vermette asserts that the combination of Donovan's young age, the circumstance at his having been at a bar with friends prior to his disappearance, and because he was Cree meant that his disappearance did not get adequate coverage by the media. Vermette cites the general apathy shown by the people of her community and the media surrounding her brother's disappearance as being the factor which instigated her own sense of the unfairness of the discrimination against Indigenous peoples by settler Canadians, leading to her desire to activate for change.

Career 
Katherena vermette is known primarily for her poetry, although she is also a writer of prose. From her viewpoint, vermette's penchant for poetry stems from the fluidity and complexity of it as a medium; it combines singing, storytelling, and even painting, yet is something entirely different.

North End Love Songs 
Vermette's first published volume of poetry, North End Love Songs functions as an ode to the place she grew up, Winnipeg's North End, and her intimate perspective on a place that is looked down upon for its high levels of reported crime. In the work, she describes her neighbourhood with respect to nature, highlighting the animals, foliage and rivers that coexist within it. In writing North End Love Songs, vermette sought to replace the prejudiced perceptions held by people outside of the North End with the beautiful way that she knows her community. The collection depicts a "young girl or woman struggling with identity and place," says vermette. This conflict between a simultaneous deep sense of affection and of defiance to one's place of origin is precisely what constitutes the idea of home, in vermette's view.

"Heart" 
A poem commissioned by CBC Aboriginal, "Heart" similarly depicts the North End of Winnipeg from vermette's personal point of view. Vermette aims to change the narrative from "that North End", known for being "broken", "tired", a "lost cause", and "beaten", to the way she knows it; rather, a place that is "healing", "working", "seeking [for a cause]", and "rising". The poem gets its name for being about the North End which, from vermette's perspective, is the "heart of the Métis nation".

The Seven Teachings Stories 
Vermette's children's picture book series The Seven Teachings Stories was published by HighWater Press https://www.portageandmainpress.com/Series/T/The-Seven-Teachings-Stories in 2015. Illustrated by Irene Kuziw, the collection aims to present the Anishnaabe Teachings of the Seven Grandfathers in a way that is easily digestible for young people. The series depicts Indigenous children in a metropolitan context, fostering a sense of representation for historically and continually marginalized Indigenous groups, among those who they are, and have been, marginalized by. The series comprises seven individual volumes: The Just Right Gift, Singing Sisters, The First Day, Kode's Quest(ion), Amik Loves School, Misaabe's Stories, and What is Truth, Betsy?.

The Break
Her debut novel The Break was published in 2016, and was a shortlisted finalist for that year's Rogers Writers' Trust Fiction Prize and Governor General's Award for English-language fiction. In November 2017, it won the Burt Award for First Nations, Métis and Inuit Literature.

Film and digital media
In 2015, she and Erika MacPherson co-directed the 20-minute National Film Board of Canada documentary This River, about Canadian Indigenous families that have had to search for family members who have disappeared. Partly based on vermette's own experience, the film received the 2016 Coup de coeur du jury award at Montreal's  festival, and premiered in vermette's hometown of Winnipeg on October 5, at the Winnipeg Art Gallery. It was named best short documentary at the 5th Canadian Screen Awards. Vermette and NFB producer Alicia Smith also created a related Instagram work, What Brings Us Here, a companion piece to The River, which offers portraits of volunteers behind the community-run Winnipeg search teams the Bear Clan and Drag the Red. Smith has stated that it was vermette's North End Love Songs which helped draw her attention to the perspectives of indigenous youth from the North End and the experience of having missing family members.

Other work 
She is a member of the Aboriginal Writers Collective of Manitoba, and edited the anthology xxx ndn: love and lust in ndn country in 2011.

In addition to her own publications, her work has also been published in the literary anthology Manitowapow: Aboriginal Writings from the Land of Water.

Accolades 
In 2013, vermette won the Governor General's Literary Award for poetry, for her collection North End Love Songs, an accolade she dubbed a "goal" for poetry, as well as being "completely unexpected". In an interview with CBC Radio, vermette discussed having considered not accepting the award, as a means of protesting the Canadian government’s treatment of the many missing and murdered Aboriginal women at the time, and disagreeing with the government’s policies in general. After consideration, Vermette decided to accept the award because the people who voted for North End Love Songs were a collection of her literary peers, making it a reflection of the Canadian poetry community, rather than the Canadian government.

In 2017, vermette won the Amazon.ca First Novel Award for The Break. Its French translation, Ligne brisée, was defended by Naomi Fontaine in the 2018 edition of Le Combat des livres, where it won the competition.

Her novel The Strangers was the winner of the 2021 Atwood Gibson Writers' Trust Fiction Prize.

Activism 
In addition to writing herself, vermette also works with young people, ostracized for their circumstances and labelled as being "at risk". This workshop focuses on utilizing writing as a means of coping with the struggles associated with growing up marginalized because of that which makes one different from the majority. Vermette seeks to promote the development in young people's artistic voice, through the medium of poetry.

Vermette has described her writing as motivated by an activist spirit, particularly on First Nations issues.

Works
North End Love Songs (2012, poetry)
The Seven Teachings Stories (2015, children's)
The Break (2016, novel)
river woman (2018, poetry)
The Girl and the Wolf (2019, children's)
The Strangers (2021, novel)

Notes

References

External links

What Brings Us Here on Instagram
 Vermette at "Voilà. Catalogue du Canada / Canada's Catalogue"

21st-century Canadian poets
Canadian women poets
Canadian children's writers
Writers from Winnipeg
Métis writers
Mennonite writers
Mennonite poets
Canadian Mennonites
Living people
Canadian women children's writers
21st-century Canadian women writers
Canadian documentary film directors
Métis filmmakers
Film directors from Winnipeg
21st-century Canadian novelists
Canadian women novelists
Canadian women film directors
Directors of Genie and Canadian Screen Award winners for Best Short Documentary Film
Year of birth uncertain
1977 births
Amazon.ca First Novel Award winners
Canadian women documentary filmmakers